Graeme Connors (born 29 April 1956) is an Australian country music singer, songwriter, and performer. Connors has released seventeen studio albums and has received fourteen Golden Guitar awards among other prestige Australian country music awards. 

In 2009 as part of the Q150 celebrations, Graeme Connors was announced as one of the Q150 Icons of Queensland for his role as an "Influential Artists".

In 2016, Connors was inducted into the Australian Roll of Renown.

Career

1965-1987: Early career
Graeme attended school St. Patricks in Mackay. Graeme commenced his music career in the mid-1970s doing support vocals for many well-known acts of the day. 

In 1974, at the age of 18, Connors opened for American singer/songwriter, Kris Kristofferson during his Australian tour. Kristofferson was so impressed with young Connors, that he took him into the recording studio to produce his 1976 debut album And When Morning Comes.

From the late 1970s through to the late 1980s, Connors wrote songs that became big hits for Slim Dusty, John Denver and Jon English.

Connors spent the first half of the 1980s writing songs based on truck driving which became hits for Slim Dusty such as "I'm Married to My Bulldog Mack" and "Dieseline Dreams".

The 1987-present
In 1988, Connors had recorded and released the breakthrough single "A Little Further North", featured on his first album on the Australian ABC Records label, North. Subsequent singles followed with the releases of "Let the Canefields Burn", "Cyclone Season", "Sicilian Born" and "A Heartache (Or Two)".

In 1995 - Connors released the album The Here and Now and won three golden guitars at the CMAA Awards, including Album of the Year. 
In 1995, Connors won MO Award for Male Country Performer of the Year and was Inducted into the Hands of Fame.

In 1998 Connors wrote the Cowboys Theme song "The Cowboys are my Team".

In 2000, Connors performed at both the Opening and Closing Ceremonies for the 2000 Paralympics and he wrote their theme song "Being Here". 

In 2011, Connors was awarded Album of the Year at the 2011 Tamworth Country Music Festival for Still Walking.

Discography

Studio albums

Live albums

Compilation albums

Awards and nominations

AIR Awards
The Australian Independent Record Awards (commonly known informally as AIR Awards) is an annual awards night to recognise, promote and celebrate the success of Australia's Independent Music sector.

|-
| AIR Awards of 2012
|At the Speed of Life 
| Best Independent Country Album
| 
|-

APRA Awards
The APRA Awards are held in Australia and New Zealand by the Australasian Performing Right Association to recognise songwriting skills, sales and airplay performance by its members annually. Lewis has won three awards from seven nominations.

|-
| 1986
| "I'm Married To My Bulldog Mack" (written by Graeme Connors / Doug Trevor)
| Most Performed Australasian Country Work
| 
|-
| 1990
| "A Little Further North Each Year" (written by Graeme Connors)
| Most Performed Australasian Country Work
| 
|-
| 1998
| "Road Less Travelled" by Graeme Connors (written by Graeme Connors)
| Most Performed Australasian Country Work
| 
|-
| 1998
| "These Uncertain Times" by Graeme Connors (written by Graeme Connors)
| Most Performed Australasian Country Work
| 
|-
| 2002
| "Good Things in Life" by Adam Brand (written by Adam Brand & Graeme Connors)
| Most Performed Australasian Country Work
| 
|-
|}

ARIA Music Awards
The ARIA Music Awards is an annual awards ceremony that recognises excellence, innovation, and achievement across all genres of Australian music. Connors has won one award from four nominations.

|-
| 1992
|Tropicali 
| Best Country Album
| 
|-
| 1994
|The Return 
| Best Country Album
| 
|-
| 1996
|The Here and Now 
| Best Country Album
| 
|-
| 1997
|The Road Less Travelled 
| Best Country Album
| 
|-

Country Music Awards (CMAA)
Connors has won fourteen Golden guitar awards at the Tamworth Country Music Awards of Australia and was inducted into the Australian Roll of Renown.
Note: Wins Only

|-
| 1989 || "We've Done Us Proud" (recorded by Slim Dusty) || Song of the Year  || 
|-
| 1995 || "Songs from the Homeland" || Song of the Year || 
|-
| 1995 || Homeland || Album of the Year  || 
|-
| 1995 || Homeland' || Male Vocalist of the Year  || 
|-
| 1996 || "The Great Australian Dream" || Song of the Year || 
|-
| 1996 || "Slowly But Surely" (with Rosemary Rae)|| Vocal Collaboration of the Year  || 
|-
| 1996 || "The Ringer and the Princess" || Bush Ballad Heritage Song || 
|-
| 1996 || "The Great Australian Dream" || Video Track of the Year || 
|-
| 1997 || The Road Less Travelled || Album of the Year || 
|-
| 1997 || "The Road Less Travelled" || Male Vocalist of the Year || 
|-
| 2001 || "Good Things in Life" (recorded by Adam Brand) || Song of the Year || 
|-
| 2004 || "The Simple Truth" || Video Track of the Year || 
|-
| 2011 || "A Good Life" || Male Artist of the Year || 
|-
| 2011 || Still Walking'' || Album of the Year || 
|-
| 2017 || himself || Australian Roll of Renown || 
|-

Mo Awards
The Australian Entertainment Mo Awards (commonly known informally as the Mo Awards), were annual Australian entertainment industry awards. They recognise achievements in live entertainment in Australia from 1975 to 2016. Graeme Connors won two awards in that time.
 (wins only)
|-
| 1994
| Graeme Connors 
| Male Country Entertainer of the Year 
| 
|-
| 1996
| Graeme Connors 
| Male Country Entertainer of the Year 
| 
|-

Tamworth Songwriters Awards
The Tamworth Songwriters Association (TSA) is an annual songwriting contest for original country songs, awarded in January at the Tamworth Country Music Festival. They commenced in 1986. Graeme Connors won nine awards in that time.
 (wins only)
|-
| 1992
| Graeme Connors 
| Songmaker Award
| 
|-
|rowspan="2"| 1994
|rowspan="2"| "Prodigal Son"
| Contemporary Song of the Year
| 
|-
| Country Song of the Year
| 
|-
| 1995
| "Songs from the Homeland"
| Contemporary Song of the Year
| 
|-
| 1996
| "The Great Australian Dream"
| Contemporary Song of the Year
| 
|-
| 1997
| "The Road Less Travelled"
| Contemporary Song of the Year
| 
|-
|rowspan="2"| 1998
| "I Believe in Santa Claus"
| Children's Song of the Year
| 
|-
| "One Child Born"
| Gospel Song of the Year
| 
|-
| 2000
| "These Uncertain Times"
| Contemporary Song of the Year
| 
|-

Other Awards
1975 American Song Festival Award
1976 American Song Festival Award
2000 Victorian Country Music Awards - Song of the Year "These Uncertain Times"
2005 Victorian Country Music Awards - Song of the Year "Hard Decisions"
2009 Q150 Queensland Icon Award
2011 WARP Gold Medallion Award (Queensland Male Vocalist of the Year)

References

External links
Graeme Connors Official Website

1956 births
Living people
APRA Award winners
ARIA Award winners
Australian country singers
Musicians from Queensland